"In the Still of the Nite", also subsequently titled "In the Still of the Night", is a song written by Fred Parris and recorded by his band the Five Satins. While only a moderate hit when first released (peaking at No. 24 on the national pop charts), it has received considerable airplay over the years and is notable as one of the best known doo-wop songs, recorded by artists such as Boyz II Men and Debbie Gibson. It is heard in several films, such as The Buddy Holly Story, Dirty Dancing, and The Irishman.

The Five Satins' original version was included in Robert Christgau's "Basic Record Library" of 1950s and 1960s recordings—published in Christgau's Record Guide: Rock Albums of the Seventies (1981)—and ranked No. 90 on Rolling Stone magazine's list of "the 500 Greatest Songs of All Time".

Background
The song was recorded in the Saint Bernadette Catholic School basement in New Haven, Connecticut in February 1956. Marty Kugell produced the song. The saxophone solo was played by Vinny Mazzetta of New Haven. The rhythm section was Doug Murray (bass), Bobby Mapp (drums) and Curlee Glover (piano).  It was originally released on Kugell's Standord label with the B-side "The Jones Girl", a play on the Mills Brothers' 1954 hit, "The Jones Boy". Although the single was only a moderate hit after it was reissued on the Ember label, peaking at No. 24 on the national pop charts and No. 3 on the R&B "race" charts (Billboard's chart designation for R&B at the time), its reputation came to surpass its original chart placement. For three decades, the single almost always topped the influential Top 500 Songs countdown on oldies radio station WCBS-FM. The track sold over 10 million copies in 1987 and 1988 as part of the Dirty Dancing soundtrack. The song was included on the highly influential 1959 LP Oldies But Goodies on Original Sound.

The song was spelled as "In the Still of the Nite" to avoid confusion with Cole Porter's "In the Still of the Night".

Excluding Christmas records, "In the Still of the Nite" is one of only two songs (the other being “Monster Mash” by Bobby (Boris) Pickett and the Crypt-Kickers) to have charted on the Hot 100 three separate times, by the same artist with the same version each time.  After initially reaching No. 24 in 1956, it was released again in 1960 and reached No. 81.  Then more than a year later in 1961 it reached No. 99.

"In the Still of the Nite" is one of two songs that may lay claim to being the origin of the term doo-wop. The plaintive doo wop, doo wah refrain in the bridge has often been suggested as the origin of the term to describe that musical genre. The other contender for the honor is "When You Dance" by the Turbans, in which the chant "doo-wop" can be heard.

Track listings
7-inch single
 "In the Still of the Nite (I'll Remember)" (LP version) – 2:51
 "Snippets from 'An American Dream'" by The Jacksons

CD maxi
 "In the Still of the Nite (I'll Remember)" (LP version) – 2:51
 "Snippets from 'An American Dream'" by The Jacksons
 "Medley" ("I Want You Back" (live) / "ABC" (live)) by The Jacksons

Boyz II Men version

Boyz II Men recorded an a cappella arrangement (a full step below the original version, in E) of the song for the soundtrack to the television miniseries The Jacksons: An American Dream. This version reached No. 3 on the US Billboard Hot 100 on January 16, 1993. It also debuted at No. 1 in New Zealand—becoming the band's second chart-topper there—and charted strongly in Australia, Canada, France, and the United Kingdom. It was later added to the 1993 re-release of their album Cooleyhighharmony.

Charts

Weekly charts

Year-end charts

Certifications

Release history

Other cover versions
 The original recording briefly hit the charts again in 1960 and 1961; an instrumental version by Santo & Johnny charted in 1964, and a version from the album Goodnight My Love by Paul Anka did likewise in 1969 (#62 Canada). None of these releases reached the top half of the Billboard Hot 100, however.
 The Crests recorded a version titled "I Remember (In The Still of the Night)" for their 1960 album The Crests Sing All Biggies on Coed Records.
 The song was used in the Disney attraction The Enchanted Tiki Room (Under New Management).
 "In the Still of the Nite" was also recorded by the Beach Boys on their 1976 album 15 Big Ones. Lead vocals were by drummer Dennis Wilson.
 Songwriters Mike Reid and Troy Seals incorporated the song in the 1985 song "Lost in the Fifties Tonight (In the Still of the Night)", performed by Ronnie Milsap. Milsap's song was a number one country hit that year.
 Debbie Gibson recorded the song transposed to C major during her Atlantic-years concert tours and recorded the same arrangement for the Atlantic soundtrack album The Wonder Years - Music from the Emmy Award-Winning Show and its Era (LP 82032).
 A version by Bruce Murray (brother of Anne Murray) reached #74 in Canada in 1979.
 Indonesian Comedy band Padhyangan cover and parodying this song as Waktu Istirahat, which the lyrics containing a boy who crying because he late of watching Scooby-Doo

In popular culture
The original Five Satins version of the song featured prominently in Martin Scorsese's 2019 epic crime film The Irishman, including the opening scene and end credits. It is the first track on the film's soundtrack album, released by Sony Music on November 8, 2019.

The original song also appeared in its entirety in David Cronenberg's 1988 psychological horror film Dead Ringers.

The song also appears on the radio of the video game Mafia II.

It also appears briefly in the TV series Gotham.

References

 "In the Still of the Nite". Rolling Stone.
 Erlewine, Stephen Thomas. "[ The Five Satins]". Allmusic.
 Whitburn, Joel. Top Pop Singles 1955–1999. Menomonee Falls, WI, 2000.

External links
  (original release)
  (1964 version by Santo & Johnny)
  (1992 version by Boyz II Men)

1956 songs
1964 singles
1992 singles
1993 singles
Motown singles
A cappella songs
Doo-wop songs
The Beach Boys songs
Jan and Dean songs
Paul Anka songs
The Fleetwoods songs
Boyz II Men songs
Grammy Hall of Fame Award recipients
Number-one singles in New Zealand